Townend is a moderate to large housing suburb (area) in Dumbarton, Scotland. It stretches from Dumbarton Central Station to Barloan Toll, and to Round Riding Rd to the east. It has a mix of residential houses, private and council lets. In the area is the set of River City, a BBC Television Drama. Dumbarton Common is situated in Townend, adjacent to the Broadmeadow Industrial Estate and The Meadow Centre, including the town's swimming bath, sauna, and fitness suite.

References

Dumbarton